Timo Lassy  (born 1974) is a Finnish jazz saxophonist, composer and bandleader. He is best known for Timo Lassy Band with whom he has recorded 6 albums together. Prior to his solo career he was a member of U-Street All Stars and The Five Corners Quintet.

Timo Lassy has had three albums on the Finnish National album chart by Ipfi.fi : In with Lassy in 2012, Love Bullet  in 2015 and Moves in 2018 all of which have also received nominations for Jazz album of the Year at the Emma Gaala. The album Moves reached #6 on the Physical album chart on week 18/2018. "Moves" won the Emma award for Jazz Album of the Year.

Timo Lassy Band recorded a feature concert  YLE Live: M1-Studiossa Timo Lassy Band which was broadcast nationally on Sunday 5 May 2013 and is available worldwide at YLE Areena. On 3 February 2018 WDR 3 broadcast a live television and radio concert by Timo Lassy from Theater Gütersloh.

Discography (selected) 
Singles

 African Rumble / High at Noon  (Ricky-Tick Records, 2006), 12 inch single
 The Call / Sweet Spot  (Ricky-Tick Records, 2007), 12 inch single
 The More I Look at You (ft. José James) / Ya Dig (instrumental) (Ricky-Tick Records 2009) 7 inch single
 Teddy The Sweeper / Where’s The Man? (Schema Records 2012) 7 inch single

Soloalbums

 The Soul & Jazz of Timo Lassy  (Ricky-Tick Records [In Japan Columbia Records], 20 June 2007)
 Round Two  (Ricky-Tick Records 2009)
 In With Lassy  (Schema Records 2012)
 Live With Lassy  (Schema Records 2013)
 Love Bullet (Membran 2015)
 Moves (Membran 2018)

Other

 Calling James/Yanki - Timo Lassy & Teppo Mäkynen Duo (We Jazz 2017), 7 inch single
 When The Devils Paid - Timo Lassy feat Ed Motta (Membran 2017), EP

References 

Finnish jazz composers
Finnish jazz saxophonists
Jazz bandleaders
Finnish flautists
1974 births
Living people